The Extensible Computational Chemistry Environment (ECCE, pronounced "etch-ā") provides a sophisticated graphical user interface, scientific visualization tools, and the underlying data management framework enabling scientists to efficiently set up calculations and store, retrieve, and analyze the rapidly growing volumes of data produced by computational chemistry studies.

Major features 
 Support for building molecular models.
 Graphical user interface to a broad range of electronic structure theory types. Supported codes currently include NWChem, GAMESS (UK), Gaussian 03, Gaussian 98, and Amica. Other codes are registered based on user requirements.
 Graphical user interface for basis set selection.
 Remote submission of calculations to UNIX and Linux workstations, Linux clusters, and supercomputers. Supported queue management systems include PBS, LSF, NQE/NQS, LoadLeveler and Maui Scheduler.
 Three-dimensional visualization and graphical display of molecular data properties while jobs are running and after completion.  Molecular orbitals and vibrational frequencies are among the properties displayed.
 Support for importing results from NWChem, Gaussian 94, Gaussian 98, and Gaussian 03 calculations run outside of the ECCE environment.
 Extensive web-based help.

See also

External links 
 
 Git Hub source code

Computational chemistry software
Molecular modelling software